The Guesthouses of Chiang Kai-shek were built in order for the former President of the Republic of China, Chiang Kai-shek, to have places to stay while travelling on inspection tours and holidays around Taiwan. According to current Republic of China statistics, there are 30 guesthouses in Taiwan which were used by Chiang during his lifetime. Many have been transformed into museums, art and literature centers, and tourist hotels.

Guesthouses
 First Guesthouse in Magong City, Penghu
 Grass Mountain Chateau in Beitou District, Taipei
 Zhongxing Guesthouse in Beitou District, Taipei

Hanbilou in Nantou
Daguan Pavilion in Lishan
Sizihwan Guesthouse in Kaohsiung (now is the Xiziwan Art Gallery of National Sun Yat-sen University)
Chengcing Lake Guesthouse in Kaohsiung
Fuxing Guesthouse in Taoyuan
Cihu in Daxi (houses the Cihu Mausoleum)
Qilan Guesthouse
Hehuanshan Pine Snow Guesthouse
Kenting Guesthouse
Alishan Honored Guesthouse
Xitou Bamboo Hut
Lushan Jingguang Mountain Villa
Changhua Bagua Mountain Guesthouse
Lishan Guesthouse
Fushou Mountain Villa
Jinshan Songtao Cabin
Hualien Wenshan Guesthouse
Chiayi Citizen Farm Guesthouse
Kaohsiung Tengzhi Guesthouse
Taichung Xieyuan Guesthouse

See also
Shilin Official Residence

References

Chiang Kai-shek
Historic sites in Taiwan
Houses in Taiwan
Presidential residences in Taiwan